Typhoon Pabuk was a high-end Category 2 typhoon that struck Japan in August of 2001. As the tenth named storm and the fifth typhoon of the 2001 Pacific typhoon season, it originated from a tropical depression to the north-northwest of Saipan. It began to develop rapidly, so the Joint Typhoon Warning Center issued a Tropical Cyclone Formation Alert. The same agency began to issue advisories on the system; thereafter, the depression was designated 14W. Every agency upgraded the depression to a tropical storm, gaining the name Pabuk from the Japan Meteorological Agency. Pabuk gradually intensified as it moved northwestward, getting upgraded to a typhoon by the JTWC on August 15, with the JMA following suit not too long after. By August 17, Pabuk briefly reached its initial peak strength as a low-end Category 2 typhoon before slowly weakening. The following day, Pabuk began to re-intensify. Pabuk also began to form an eye.  By August 19, Pabuk reached its second peak intensity with 1-minute sustained winds of 165 km/h (105 mph). Pabuk grew in size, and its eye became irregular, hinting on a weakening trend while moving north northeastward. Pabuk weakened to tropical storm intensity when it hit the southern coast of Japan, south of Osaka, on August 21. On August 22, both the JMA and the JTWC issued their final advisories after Pabuk became extratropical. The name Pabuk was submitted by Laos and refers to the Mekong giant catfish. Pabuk brought heavy rain to Japan and damaged fields. Pabuk caused 8 fatalities and caused $5.55 million (2001 USD) in damages.

Meteorological history 

On August 13, the Japan Meteorological Agency started to track a tropical depression that was embedded to the monsoon to the north-northwest of Saipan. Due to its rapid development, the Joint Typhoon Warning Center issued a Tropical Cyclone Formation Alert. The JTWC began issuing advisories; thereafter, giving the designation of 14W. All agencies upgraded 14W to a tropical storm the next day, after satellite imagery depicted a well-defined Low-level Circulation Center along with gale-force winds to the south of it. The JMA gave the storm the name Pabuk. Moving northwestward, Pabuk gradually intensified, and the JTWC upgraded the system to a typhoon on August 15; the JMA did the same 24 hours later. By August 17, Pabuk briefly reached its initial peak strength as a low-end Category 2 typhoon as it moved west-northwest before slowly weakening. During the next day, Pabuk began to re-intensify as a banding eye feature began to develop. Satellite animated imagery showed an eyewall forming with deep convection. By 06:00 UTC of August 19, Pabuk reached its second peak intensity with 1-minute sustained winds of 165 km/h (105 mph). The typhoon grew in size, and its eye became irregular, hinting on a weakening trend while moving north northeastward. Pabuk weakened to tropical storm intensity when it hit the southern coast of Japan, south of Osaka, on 12:00 UTC of August 21. On August 22, both the JMA and the JTWC issued its final advisory after it became extratropical.

Preparations and impact 
Pabuk brought heavy rainfall in the southern part of Honshu, which flooded many homes and disrupting sea and air travel. As the typhoon was approaching, the JMA warned on heavy winds and strong gusts along the southwestern and western coastline of Japan. Heavy rainfall was forecast throughout most of the nation to as far south as Okinawa, with the Kii Peninsula being forecast to have rainfall of about 300 mm (11.8 in). Around 70 homes were flooded in the island of Amami Ōshima alone. Moreover, the launch of the next-generation rocket H-IIA was also halted due to stormy conditions. Throughout Japan, the storm resulted in eight fatalities and 141 injured people. 917 hectares of fields were damaged. Multiple types of transportation were cancelled. Total damages from the typhoon amounted to ¥630 million (US$5.55 million).

See also 

 Typhoon Lorna (1954) – a strong Category 3 typhoon that severely impacted some areas of Honshu Island, especially Yokohama and Tokyo while also causing damages across the Northern Mariana Islands. 
 Tropical Storm Louise (1967) – took a comparable trajectory. 
 Typhoon Melor (2009) – took a nearly identical track. 
 Typhoon Phanfone (2014) – a powerful tropical cyclone which affected Japan in early October 2014.
 Typhoon Vongfong (2014) – the most intense tropical cyclone worldwide in 2014 and struck Japan as a large tropical system.

Notes

References

External links 

 Digital Typhoon: Typhoon 200111 (PABUK) - General Information (Pressure and Track Charts) (nii.ac.jp)
 Digital Typhoon: Typhoon 200111 (PABUK) - Detailed Track Information (nii.ac.jp)

Typhoons in Japan
2001 Pacific typhoon season